Nicholas Brendan Buckley  (born April 1968) is a British charity worker and political candidate. He spent 15 years working with the homeless.

In 2011, he founded The Mancunian Way, a charity which fired him in 2020. However, following a public outcry, the board of trustees resigned and Buckley was reinstated.

Career
Buckley's career with the Manchester City Council started as a youth intervention officer. In 2011, Buckley's job as a Community Safety Co-ordinator, which he held during the 2011 Manchester riots, was terminated by the City Council due to budget cuts.  He was offered an alternative position; instead of taking it, he took his severance and used it to found a charity named Mancunian Way, which worked to reduce antisocial behaviour via prevention and intervention.

In 2018, Buckley stood as an independent candidate in the Local Council elections in the Deansgate ward of Manchester. Nick Buckley received 164 votes in total, and did not gain office. The election was won by three Labour candidates.

Buckley was recognized at the 2018 NW Charity Awards with the "Small Charity Big Impact Award" and at the 2019 SME News Finance Awards 2019, winning "Greater Manchester Homeless Project of the Year." While Buckley was CEO, the charity he founded was recognised as "Community Project of the Year award" in 2015.

In 2019, Buckley, who spent 15 years working directly with the homeless, explained on BBC Radio that individuals handing out food to the homeless have unintended consequences, including preventing them from getting the necessary support and help to get off the street.  Buckley criticized Lucy Powell, saying her "words would have a negative effect on teenagers from deprived backgrounds."  One of Buckley's projects, Change4Good, "placed 28 homeless or vulnerable individuals into employment" that year. He was appointed Member of the Order of the British Empire in the 2019 New Year Honours for services for services to young people and to the community in Greater Manchester.

In 2020, Nick Buckley was the centre of a controversy linked to an article he authored and posted on medium.com and shared with Mancunian Way staff and on the professional networking site LinkedIn. The article was critical of the Black Lives Matter movement. It was accused of upholding inequalities by those calling for his dismissal via an online petition. The article was later taken down.

The trustees of Mancunian Way dismissed Buckley on 19 June 2020, announcing that the charity had severed their relationship with Nick Buckley's company BNB services Ltd.

Nick Buckley was reinstated after reaching a pre-lawsuit agreement with the existing trustees, which saw them step down en masse to be replaced by a new set of trustees.

In 2021, Buckley was announced as the Reform UK candidate for Mayor of Greater Manchester.

Personal life
Buckley grew up in the Longsight area of Manchester.

References

Living people
People from Manchester
British charity and campaign group workers
Members of the Order of the British Empire
1968 births